My Father's Guests  is a 2010 French comedy film written, directed by, and starring Anne Le Ny, along with Karin Viard, Fabrice Luchini and Michel Aumont.

Plot 
Lucien Paumelle, retired physician, is a longtime activist (Resistance, abortion rights). By conviction, he decided to host a clandestine and her daughter from Moldova. But the relationship between Tatiana and Lucien Paumelle aren't well regarded by his children, Babette and Arnaud.

Cast 
 Karin Viard as Babette Paumelle
 Fabrice Luchini as Arnaud Paumelle
 Michel Aumont as Lucien Paumelle
 Valérie Benguigui as Karine Paumelle
 Veronica Novak as Tatiana
 Raphaël Personnaz as Carter
 Olivier Rabourdin as Rémy
 Flore Babled as Julie
 Max Renaudin Pratt as Simon
 Emma Siniavski as Sorina
 Benjamin Atlan as Théo
 Marie Agnès Brigot as Madame Delbard
 Cidalia Valente as Madame Da Silva
 Monique Couturier as Aunt Hélène
 Anne Le Ny as The woman in the car

References

External links 
 

2010 films
2010 comedy films
2010s French-language films
French comedy films
Films directed by Anne Le Ny
2010s French films